Cheeverstown is a stop on the Luas light-rail tram system in Dublin, Ireland.  It opened in 2011 as a stop on the extension of the Red Line to Saggart.  The stop is located on a section of reserved track at the side of Katherine Tynan Road in the Cheeverstown area of south-west Dublin.  
The stop has a park and ride facility with 312 spaces.

References

Luas Red Line stops in South Dublin (county)